Makwaia wa Kuhenga is  a Tanzanian columnist, author and a television presenter.

Early life and career
In 1991, he graduated from the University of Wales in Cardiff with an MA in journalism.

Publications

References

External links
 Daily News column

Living people
Tanzanian columnists
Tanzanian writers
Tanzanian television presenters
Alumni of Cardiff University
Year of birth missing (living people)